Billy Pierre Bakker (born 23 November 1988) is a Dutch former field hockey player who played as a midfielder or forward for the Dutch national team.

Bakker scored a total of 65 goals in 236 appearances for the national team from 2009 until 2021.

Club career
Bakker started playing hockey at age six at Randwijck. When he was 10 years old he moved to Amsterdam, where he made his debut in the first senior team in 2007. In 2012 he became the captain of the team. He won the Dutch national title in 2010–11 and 2011–12. In 2017 he played a season in the Hockey India League for the Kalinga Lancers, where they won the title.

International career
Bakker made his debut for the national team on 28 November 2009 at the 2009 Men's Hockey Champions Trophy. At the 2012 Summer Olympics, he competed for the national team in the men's tournament, winning a silver medal. He was the captain of the Dutch national team at the 2018 World Cup, where they won the silver medal. In 2017 and 2018, Bakker was nominated for the FIH Player of the Year Award. After the 2020 Summer Olympics he announced his retirement from the national team.

Honours

Club
Amsterdam
Hoofdklasse: 2010–11, 2011–12
Gold Cup: 2018–19

Kalinga Lancers
Hockey India League: 2017

International
Netherlands
EuroHockey Championship: 2015, 2017, 2021
Hockey World League: 2012–13

References

External links
 

1988 births
Living people
Dutch male field hockey players
Field hockey players from Amsterdam
Male field hockey midfielders
Male field hockey forwards
2010 Men's Hockey World Cup players
Field hockey players at the 2012 Summer Olympics
2014 Men's Hockey World Cup players
Field hockey players at the 2016 Summer Olympics
2018 Men's Hockey World Cup players
Field hockey players at the 2020 Summer Olympics
Olympic field hockey players of the Netherlands
Olympic silver medalists for the Netherlands
Olympic medalists in field hockey
Medalists at the 2012 Summer Olympics
Amsterdamsche Hockey & Bandy Club players
Men's Hoofdklasse Hockey players
Hockey India League players
21st-century Dutch people